The Centrocnemidinae are a subfamily of the reduviid (assassin bugs), found exclusively on tree trunks, where their bodies camouflage well. There are four genera with about 34 species described.

Genera
Centrocnemis Signoret, 1852
Centrocnemoides Miller, 1956
Neocentrocnemis Miller, 1956
Paracentrocnemis Miller, 1956

References

Reduviidae
Hemiptera subfamilies